Aleksandr Nikolayevich Zabelin (born 6 December 1931) is a Russian former sport shooter who competed in the 1960 Summer Olympics and in the 1964 Summer Olympics. He won the bronze medal in the 25m pistol event at the 1960 Summer Olympics.

References

External links

1931 births
Possibly living people
Russian male sport shooters
ISSF pistol shooters
Olympic shooters of the Soviet Union
Shooters at the 1960 Summer Olympics
Shooters at the 1964 Summer Olympics
Olympic bronze medalists for the Soviet Union
Olympic medalists in shooting
Medalists at the 1960 Summer Olympics
Lesgaft National State University of Physical Education, Sport and Health alumni